Francis Glebas (born April 12, 1952) is an American keynote speaker, writer, film director, storyboard artist, and teacher. He worked in films such as Aladdin, The Lion King, Pocahontas, The Hunchback of Notre Dame, Dinosaur, Hercules, Treasure Planet, Fantasia 2000, Piglet's Big Movie, Space Chimps, Rio and Ice Age: Continental Drift.

He has taught and consulted on animation, story, storytelling and storyboarding at the New York Institute of Technology, University of California, Los Angeles, Gnomon School of Visual Effects and Walt Disney Imagineering.

He has given Keynote speeches at TMRE 2016, CalArts 2016, Gnomon School of Visual Effects 2017.

Publications
 Directing the Story: Professional Storyboarding and Storytelling Techniques for Live Action and Animation, Focal Press, 2008.
 The Animator's Eye, Focal Press, 2012.
 Iggy's Incredibly Easy Way to Write a Story, 2012

References

External links
  Francis Glebas 
 Francis Glebas story artist
 Francis Glebas on Blogspot

1952 births
American male writers
Animators from California
American male screenwriters
American film directors
American film producers
American animated film directors
American animated film producers
Animation screenwriters
Place of birth missing (living people)
American storyboard artists
Living people
Walt Disney Animation Studios people
New York Institute of Technology faculty
University of California, Los Angeles faculty